is a trans-Neptunian object and binary system that belongs to the scattered disc (like Eris). Its discovery was announced on 31 March 2014.

Orbit

 orbits the Sun once every 449 years. It will come to perihelion around November 2202, at a distance of about 35.6 AU. It is currently near aphelion, 80 AU from the Sun, and, as a result, it has an apparent magnitude of 22. Its orbit has a significant inclination of 33°.

Physical properties
Using the Atacama Large Millimeter Array and Magellan Telescopes, its albedo was found to be 0.17, and its colour to be moderately red.  is one of the largest moderately red TNOs.

Brown estimated, prior to the discovery of its satellite, that  was very likely to be a dwarf planet, due to its large size.

Satellite

The discovery was announced on 10 August 2018. The satellite does not have a provisional designation nor a proper name. Follow-up observations were taken between May and July 2018 in order to determine the orbit of the satellite, but the results of these observations remain yet to be published . Once the orbit is known, the mass of the system can be determined.

See also 
List of Solar System objects most distant from the Sun
List of Solar System objects by size

Notes

References

External links 
 2013 FY27, Minor planets with Satellites Database, Johnston's Archive 
 Celestia Files of the recent Dwarf Planet finds (Ian Musgrave: 6 April 2014)
 Gaggle of dwarf planets found by Dark Energy Camera (Aviva Rutkin: 2 April 2014)
 
 

532037
Discoveries by Scott S. Sheppard
Discoveries by Chad Trujillo
532037
20130317
532037
20130317
20140331